Chaplain (Major General) Matthew Augustus Zimmerman, Jr., USA (born December 9, 1941) is a retired American Army officer who served as the 18th Chief of Chaplains of the United States Army from 1990 to 1994. He was the first African American to hold this position.

He is a member of Omega Psi Phi fraternity.

Awards and decorations

External links

Notable member of Omega Psi Phi

Further reading

African-American United States Army personnel
United States Army generals
United States Army personnel of the Vietnam War
Recipients of the Legion of Merit
Chiefs of Chaplains of the United States Army
Living people
1941 births
Vietnam War chaplains
Deputy Chiefs of Chaplains of the United States Army
20th-century American clergy
21st-century African-American people
African Americans in the Vietnam War
20th-century African-American people